Achille Essebac (29 January 1868 – 1 August 1936) was a French writer primarily known for his novel Dédé about an ill-fated homoerotic friendship between two schoolboys. Essebac was a pseudonym, since his original surname Bécasse is a derogatory word for goose.

Essebac was a friend of Jacques d'Adelswärd-Fersen and defended him against accusations of indecency caused by Fersen's penchant for tableaux vivants at his house in Avenue de Friedland. In 1909, Essebac also contributed an article for Fersen's short-lived gay-interest journal Akademos. However, apart from the article, Essebac largely avoided writing about homosexuality after the Fersen scandal.

Essebac was also a photographer of young men, preferably clothed in Renaissance or medieval theatrical costumes. A recently rediscovered album with 156 photographs by him was sold for €3,500 in Paris.

In the 1920s and early 1930s the Dédé-bar existed in Berlin, which was a gay bar named after Essebac's best-known gay character from his novels.

Books

Partenza... vers la beauté !, 1898
Dédé, 1901
Luc, 1902
L’Élu, 1902
Les Boucs, 1903
Les Griffes, 1904
Nuit païenne, 1907

References

Jean-Claude Féray, Achille Essebac, romancier du désir, Paris, Quintes-Feuilles, 2008. 
Achille Essebac, Dédé. Translated from the French into German by Georg Herbert. With an afterword by Jean-Claude Féray. Hamburg: Männerschwarm Verlag, 2008 (Bibliothek rosa Winkel, Vol. 47), 256 pp., illus.

External links
Caspar Wintermans: The Rediscovery of Achille Essebac in Gay News (2008-10-31)

1868 births
1936 deaths
Writers from Paris
19th-century French novelists
20th-century French novelists
French gay writers
French LGBT novelists
French male novelists
19th-century French male writers
20th-century French male writers